The 2008–09 Talk 'N Text Tropang Texters season was the 19th season of the franchise in the Philippine Basketball Association (PBA).

Key dates
August 30: The 2008 PBA Draft took place in Fort Bonifacio, Taguig.
September 1: The free agency period started.

Draft picks

Current depth chart

Roster

Philippine Cup

Standings

Game log

|- bgcolor="#bbffbb"
| 1
| October 4
| Coca Cola
| 98–97
| 
| 
| 
| Araneta Coliseum
| 1–0
|- bgcolor="#bbffbb"
| 2
| October 9
| Air21
| 112–101
| Dillinger (23) Alapag (23)
| 
| 
| Ynares Sports Arena
| 2–0
|- bgcolor="#edbebf" 
| 3
| October 12
| Sta.Lucia
| 96–117
| Cardona (19)
| 
| 
| Araneta Coliseum
| 2–1
|- bgcolor="#edbebf" 
| 4
| October 17
| San Miguel
| 77–84
| Cardona (27)
| 
| 
| Araneta Coliseum
| 2–2
|- bgcolor="#bbffbb" 
| 5
| October 24
| Alaska
| 91–83
| Cardona (24)
| 
| 
| Ynares Center
| 3–2
|- bgcolor="#edbebf" 
| 6
| October 29
| Red Bull
| 102–104
| Cardona (26)
| 
| 
| Araneta Coliseum
| 3–3
|- bgcolor="#edbebf" 
| 7
| October 31
| Rain or Shine
| 96–104
| Cardona (27)
| 
| 
| Araneta Coliseum
| 3–4

|- bgcolor="#edbebf" 
| 8
| November 7
| Purefoods
| 87–88
| Cardona (21)
| 
| 
| Cuneta Astrodome
| 3–5
|- bgcolor="#bbffbb" 
| 9
| November 12
| Brgy.Ginebra
| 103–90
| 
| 
| 
| Cuneta Astrodome
| 4–5
|- bgcolor="#bbffbb" 
| 10
| November 16
| Red Bull
| 103–93
| Cardona (42)
| 
| 
| Cuneta Astrodome
| 5–5
|- bgcolor="#edbebf"
| 11
| November 22
| Alaska
| 86–113
| Castro (16)
| 
| 
| The Arena in San Juan
| 5–6
|- bgcolor="#bbffbb" 
| 12
| November 26
| Sta.Lucia
| 104–83
| 
| 
| 
| Araneta Coliseum
| 6–6
|- bgcolor="#bbffbb" 
| 13
| November 30
| San Miguel
| 85–80 
| Alapag (20)
| 
| 
| Singapore Indoor Stadium
| 7–6

|- bgcolor="#bbffbb" 
| 14
| December 7
| Coca Cola
| 90–82
| Cardona (29)
| 
| 
| Araneta Coliseum
| 8–6
|- bgcolor="#bbffbb"
| 15
| December 10
| Rain or Shine
| 92–83 
| Cardona (24) Alapag (24)
| 
| 
| Araneta Coliseum
| 9–6
|- bgcolor="#edbebf"
| 16
| December 14
| Purefoods
| 93–96
| 
| 
| 
| Araneta Coliseum
| 9–7
|- bgcolor="#bbffbb" 
| 17
| December 17
| Brgy.Ginebra
| 109–85
| 
| 
| 
| Araneta Coliseum
| 10–7
|- bgcolor="#bbffbb" 
| 18
| December 25
| Air21
| 109–108
| 
| 
| 
| Araneta Coliseum
| 11–7

Awards and records

Awards

Records
Note: Talk 'N Text Tropang Texters Records Only

Transactions

Trades

Free Agents

Subtractions

References

TNT Tropang Giga seasons
Talk 'N Text Tropang Texters